Matthew Sinclair (born 26 January 1980) is a Jamaican cricketer. He played in thirteen first-class and six matches for the Jamaican cricket team from 1998 to 2003.

See also
 List of Jamaican representative cricketers

References

External links
 

1980 births
Living people
Jamaican cricketers
Jamaica cricketers
People from Saint Elizabeth Parish